Gods of the Earth is the second studio album by American doom metal band The Sword, released in Europe on March 31, 2008, and in the United States on April 1. It gave the band their first experience of commercial success when it peaked at #102 on the Billboard 200 chart. The single released from the album was "Fire Lances of the Ancient Hyperzephyrians", which did not chart. Gods of the Earth was later re-released as part of a two-disc box set with Age of Winters on November 25, 2008. Their track "The Black River" was featured in the game Guitar Hero: Metallica, released in March 2009. "Maiden, Mother & Crone" is featured in Guitar Hero 5, released in September 2009.

Track listing
All lyrics written by J. D. Cronise; all music composed by The Sword.

Lyrics
Several songs reference Conan the Barbarian stories by fantasy author Robert E. Howard. "The Frost-Giant's Daughter" is based on Howard's short story by the same name and "The Black River" was inspired by "Beyond the Black River", while "How Heavy This Axe" makes references to Howard's fictional Hyborian Age. "To Take the Black" is a direct reference to the Night's Watch in George R. R. Martin's A Song of Ice and Fire, while "Maiden, Mother & Crone" is a reference to the Faith of the Seven in the same series.

Personnel
The Sword
J. D. Cronise – vocals, guitar, production, mixing
Kyle Shutt – guitar, mixing
Bryan Richie – bass, engineering, mixing
Trivett Wingo – drums, percussion, mixing
Additional personnel
Andrew Hernandez – engineering, mixing
J. J. Golden – mastering
Geoff Kern – artwork, design

Release history

References

The Sword albums
2008 albums